Pauline Parmentier is the defending champion.

Seeds

Main draw

Finals

Top half

Bottom half

References
 Main Draw
 Qualifying Draw

Open GDF Suez de Biarritz - Singles